Cedar Fork Township (also designated Township 5) is one of twenty townships within Wake County, North Carolina, United States. As of the 2010 census, Cedar Fork Township had a population of 40,841, a 274.3% increase over 2000.

Cedar Fork Township, occupying  in northwestern Wake County, includes all of the town of Morrisville, portions of Cary, Raleigh, and the Research Triangle Park, as well as the Raleigh-Durham International Airport.

The southeastern portion of Triangle Township in Durham County that borders Wake County was originally a separate Durham township also named Cedar Fork.

References

Townships in Wake County, North Carolina
Townships in North Carolina